Denis Kiwanuka Lote (25 March 1938 – 24 April 2022) was a Ugandan Roman Catholic prelate who served as Archbishop of the Roman Catholic Archdiocese of Tororo, from 27 June 2007 until 2 January 2014. He previously served as Bishop of the Diocese of Kotido from 20 May 1991 until 27 June 2007.

Background and priesthood
Lote was born on 25 March 1938 in Kadumure Village, in present-day Pallisa District, in the Eastern Region of Uganda. He was ordained a priest on 19 December 1965. He served as priest in the Archdiocese of Tororo until 20 May 1991.

As bishop
He was appointed Bishop of Kotido on 20 May 1991 and was consecrated a bishop at Kotido on 18 August by Archbishop Emmanuel Wamala, Archbishop of Kampala Archdiocese, assisted by Bishop James Odongo, Bishop of Military Ordinariate of Uganda and Bishop Paul Lokiru Kalanda, Bishop of Roman Catholic Diocese of Fort Portal.

On 27 June 2007, Lote was appointed Archbishop of Tororo  and was installed as Archbishop on 14 September 2007. He advocated for advance planning, education and preservation of the environment. He retired on 2 January 2014, at the age of 75 years and 9 months, thereafter the Archbishop Emeritus of Tororo.

Death
After twelve days in Nsambya Hospital, Lote died on 24 April 2022, aged 84.

References

External links
 Profile of the Roman Catholic Diocese of Tororo
 Overview of the Roman Catholic Diocese of Tororo
 Denis Kiwanuka Lote at Catholic Hierarchy

1938 births
2022 deaths
People from Pallisa District
20th-century Roman Catholic bishops in Uganda
21st-century Roman Catholic archbishops in Uganda
Roman Catholic bishops of Kotido
Roman Catholic archbishops of Tororo